CHYF-FM is a radio station which broadcasts a First Nations community radio format on the frequency 88.9 FM in M'Chigeeng First Nation, Ontario, Canada.

Carrying on business as GIMA Radio (not for profit), the station received CRTC approval to use the 88.9 MHz frequency on June 17, 2010.

The station began testing with Industry Canada on August 23, 2010, and announced a celebration of inaugural broadcast in honor of Carl Beam on August 25, 2010, at the location of the stations host, Neon Raven Art Gallery, 53 Corbiere Rd, M'chigeeng, which was also the home and ancestral land of Carl Beam.

In 2015, Gimaa Radio relaunch fuels hopes for language renaissance.

On November 28, 2016, Gimaa Giigidoowin Communications (GGC) applied for authority to effect a change in the ownership and effective control of the English and aboriginal language Type B Native radio station CHYF-FM M'Chigeeng. The CRTC approved the application on March 21, 2017.

References

External links

HYF
HYF
Ojibwe culture
Radio stations established in 2010
2010 establishments in Ontario